Polyarrhena is a genus of low, branching shrublets that is assigned to the daisy family (Compositae or Asteraceae). Its stems are alternately and densely set with entire or somewhat toothed leaves. Like in almost all Asteraceae, the individual flowers are 5-merous, small and clustered in typical heads, and which are surrounded by an involucre of in this case three whorls of bracts. In Polyarrhena, the centre of the head is taken by yellow disc florets, and is surrounded by one single whorl of white ligulate florets that have a pinkish-purple wash on the underside. These florets sit on a common base (or receptacle) and are not individually subtended by a bract (or palea). The species occur in the Cape Floristic Region. Polyarrhena reflexa has long been cultivated as an ornamental and is often known under its synonym Aster reflexum.

Taxonomy 
In his famous work Species Plantarum, Carl Linnaeus described Aster reflexus, which was the first valid scientific description of a species that is now assigned to the genus Polyarrhena. Carl Peter Thunberg thought this species would be better placed in Chrysocoma. In the Dictionnaire des Sciences Naturelles, volume 56, that was published in 1828, French Asteraceae specialist Henri Cassini erected the genus Polyarrhena, and named the type species Polyarrhena reflexa, that was based on Aster reflexus. The genus name is a contraction of  "many", and  "male", which Cassini chose because he said it fitted this genus. Christian Friedrich Lessing in 1832 assigned P. reflexa to his new genus Elphegea, with two other species that have sterile disc florets, E. bergeriana (now Felicia bergeriana) and E. ciliata (now Zyrphelis taxifolia), Nees von Esenbeck in the following year retained Polyarrhena, but Augustin Pyramus de Candolle included P. reflexa in Felicia in 1835, while Irish botanist William Henry Harvey in 1865 reenlisted the species under Aster. Jürke Grau in his review of the genus extended Polyarrhena by reassigning Felicia imbricata, and describing two new species, Polyarrhena prostrata and P. stricta, and two new subspecies, P. reflexa subsp. brachyphylla and P. prostrata subsp. dentata.

Description 
Three types of hairs can be found on these plants, stiff bristles with several cells at their base, thin hairs consisting of several rows of cells and short glandular hairs. The branches are mostly densely set with alternate leaves entire or weakly toothed margins, densely hairy or soon becoming hairless. The heads stand individually at the tip of side branches, which sometimes themselves occur in clusters. A leafless inflorescence stem (or peduncle) may be present or absent. The centre of the heads is taken by only male, only bisexual, yellow disc florets or a mixture of the two, which is encircled by one row of female white ligulate florets, that have a pinkish purple wash on the reverse, have a pointy tip without teeth. The style has triangular appendages. The dull brown to yellowish, indehiscent one-seeded fruits (called cypselas) have no short hairs over their surface, have two vascular bundles along their edges, are crowned by one row of bone-colored, soft hairs (or pappus)with short teeth along their length that easily detach.

Differences between the species 

Convergent evolution 
The species of Polyarrhena have a strong likeness to those of Felicia section Anhebecarpaea, in particular P. reflexa to F. echinata, P. imbricata to F. nordenstamii and P. stricta to F. westae.

Conservation 
For two taxa, Polyarrhena imbricata and P. reflexa subsp. reflexa the continued survival is considered to be of least concern. Both subspecies of P. prostrata are considered rare. P. reflexa subsp. brachyphylla is thought to be a vulnerable species. For P. stricta, insufficient data are available to assess its conservation status.

References 

Endemic flora of South Africa
Astereae
Asteraceae genera